Perumazhakkalam (English: The season of heavy rains) is a 2004 Indian Malayalam-language romantic drama film directed by Kamal and written by T. A. Razzaq. It stars Meera Jasmine, Kavya Madhavan, Dileep, Vineeth and Biju Menon. Notable associate director Salim Padiyath produced the film under the banner of Rasikar Films and it was distributed by Valiyaveettil Movies.

In 2004  the film won five Kerala State Film Awards  and the National Film Award for Best Film on Other Social Issues. Perumazhakkalam was released on November 12 coinciding with Diwali. The movie was officially adapted in Hindi in 2006 as Dor by Nagesh Kukunoor.

Plot 
Akbar is happily married to Raziya. Akbar goes to the Persian Gulf for employment. There he befriends Raghu Rama Iyer and John Kuruvilla. The three become good friends. Akbar loans some money to another Indian named Haneefa working with them. Haneefa absconds with the money and all efforts to get back the money goes in vain. During a fight with Haneefa, Akbar hits him but misses and accidentally kills Raghu. He is now facing the death penalty. The only way for him to escape the penalty is to obtain a letter from Raghu's wife Ganga that she pardons him.

Raziya and her father Abdu travel to Palakkad to meet Ganga to plead for mercy and obtain such a letter from her. They stay in Abdu's old friend Kunjikannan's house. Ganga's in-laws refuse to let her meet Ganga but Raziya persists. She finally meets Ganga when she is visiting the temple, but Ganga is confused and leaves the scene. Raziya is finally thrown out from the community compound by Raghu's relatives. Ganga finally realizes that she must pardon Akbar, but Raziya has left for her home by then. Realizing that pardoning Akbar could lead to ostracisation by her community, Ganga braves the situation and meets Raziya and signs the letter of pardon. When she returns home, she is thrown out of her home by her in laws and the community.

Akbar returns after serving a seven years sentence and the family go to meet Ganga where the children of the families bond with each other oblivious to the relationship between their parents.

Cast 

 Meera Jasmine as Raziya
 Kavya Madhavan as Ganga
 Dileep as Akbar, Raziya's husband
 Vineeth as Raghu Rama Iyer, Ganga's husband
 Biju Menon as John Kuruvila
 Mamukkoya	as Abdu
 Sadiq as Najeeb
 Salim Kumar as Aamu Elappa
 Kalasala Babu as Krishna Iyer
 Yadu Krishnan	as Sethu
 Mala Aravindan as Kunjikkannan
 Babu Namboothiri as Mani Swamy
 Shivaji as Vishnu (Voice By Suresh Krishna)
 Valsala Menon as Paatty
 Ramya Nambeeshan as Neelima (Voice By Nithuna Nevil Dinesh)
 Ramu as M. L. A. Salim Thangal
 Vijeesh as TV Anchor Chandradas
 Bindu Ramakrishnan

Awards 
National Film Award
 National Film Award for Best Film on Other Social Issues

Kerala State Film Award
Best Actress: Kavya Madhavan
Best Story : T. A. Razzaq
Kerala State Film Award for Best Music Director: M. Jayachandran
Kerala State Film Award for Best Sound Recordist : N. Harikumar
Special Mention : Mamukkoya

Filmfare Awards South
 Filmfare Award for Best Music Director – Malayalam : M. Jayachandran

Asianet Film Awards
 Best Director : Kamal
 Best Actress  : Meera Jasmine
 Best Screenplay : T A Razak
 Best Music Director : M Jayachandran
 Best Male Playback Singer : M Jayachandran
 Special Jury Award : Kavya Madhavan

It was screened at the competition section of International Film Festival of Kerala.

Track list

All songs were composed by M. Jayachandran. and lyrics are penned by Kaithapram and Rafeeque Ahammed.

Reception 
Shobha Warrier of Rediff wrote, "It is an emotional film, and very sensitively made. For Kamal, who had been making blockbusters for the last few years, this is an important film as a filmmaker."

References

External links 
 

2000s Malayalam-language films
2004 films
Films directed by Kamal (director)
Indian romantic drama films
Films scored by M. Jayachandran
Films shot in Palakkad
Films shot in Kozhikode
Best Film on Other Social Issues National Film Award winners
Malayalam films remade in other languages